Pickman is a surname. Notable people with the surname include: 

Benjamin T. Pickman (1790–1835), American politician
Benjamin Pickman Jr. (1763–1843), American politician 
Dudley Leavitt Pickman (1779–1846), American merchant
Paul Israel Pickman (born 1958), American film director